Rizab Rural District is a rural district (dehestan) in Qatruyeh District, Neyriz County, Fars Province, Iran. At the 2006 census, its population was 11,363, in 2,560 families.  The rural district has 70 villages.

References 

Rural Districts of Fars Province
Neyriz County